Sucksdorff is a surname. Notable people with the surname include:

Arne Sucksdorff (1917–2001), Swedish film director
Kurt Sucksdorff (1904–1960), Swedish ice hockey goaltender

German-language surnames